William D. Staples (November 10, 1868 – April 21, 1929) was a Canadian farmer, politician, and office holder.

Born in Fleetwood, in the Township of Manvers, Ontario, Staples was educated at the Public School of Fleetwood, the High School of Lindsay and the Winnipeg Collegiate Institute. He held a 2nd class Teacher's certificate and was a farmer. He was twelve years in the Municipal Council as Councillor and Reeve of Treherne, Manitoba. He was elected to the House of Commons of Canada for Macdonald in the 1904 federal election. A Conservative, he was re-elected in 1908 and 1911. He resigned his seat in 1912 when he was appointed a Grain Commissioner for Canada.

References
 The Canadian Parliament; biographical sketches and photo-engravures of the senators and members of the House of Commons of Canada. Being the tenth Parliament, elected November 3, 1904
 William D. Staples (1868-1929)

External links
 

1868 births
1929 deaths
Conservative Party of Canada (1867–1942) MPs
Members of the House of Commons of Canada from Manitoba